John Everard may refer to:

John Breedon Everard (1844–1923), English civil engineer and architect
John Everard (photographer), British photographer
John Everard I (fl. 1407–1431), MP for Rochester (UK Parliament constituency)
John Everard (?died 1445), MP for Great Bedwyn and Old Sarum
John Everard (Australian politician) (died 1886), Australian politician in the Victorian Legislative Assembly
John Everard (footballer) (1881–1952), Australian rules footballer
John Everard (preacher) (1584–1641), English preacher and author
John Everard (MP) (c. 1550–1624), Irish judge and politician
John Everard (diplomat), former British Ambassador to Belarus, Uruguay, and North Korea